The European Deterrence Initiative (EDI), prior to 2017 known as the European Reassurance Initiative, is a program that was initiated in June 2014, about three months after the Annexation of Crimea by the Russian Federation, by the White House to increase the U.S. presence in Europe for security purposes. "The EDI continues to enhance the presence and readiness in Europe to deter Russian aggression."

Synopsis
The EDI is funded through the Department of Defense. Since EDI was first proposed in Fiscal Year (FY) 2014, the initiative has provided funding in support of five lines of effort: (1) Increased Presence, (2) Exercises and Training, (3) Enhanced Prepositioning, (4) Improved Infrastructure, and (5) Building Partnership Capacity. The FY 2022 EDI budget request supports an average force strength of 9,954 active, reserve, and guard personnel in U.S. European Command USEUCOM, including 9,452 Army, 459 Air Force, and 43 Navy personnel. The EDI provides one of the primary funding sources for the USEUCOM and USEUCOM Service Components to continue the posture adjustments made in response to the European security environment.
 Continue to enhance the capability and readiness of U.S. Forces, NATO Allies, and regional partners of the U.S. for a faster response to any aggression in Europe and transnational threats by a regional adversary against the sovereign territory of NATO nations.
 Bolster the security and capacity of our NATO Allies and partners, enabling allied investments toward Article 3 responsibilities, and assuring the United States’ commitment to Article 5 and the territorial integrity of all NATO nations.
 Continue to improve theater Joint Reception, Staging, Onward Movement, and Integration (JRSO&I), ECAOS, and APS capabilities.

The initiative increased in appropriation from a $1 billion operation to $3.4 billion by 2017. In May 2017, U.S. President Donald Trump proposed adding another $1.4 billion (+40%) to the appropriation. 

Operation Atlantic Resolve is covered by the initiative.

In September 2019, a diversion of some of the funding was announced to extend the US-Mexico border wall.

According to GovWin, "the EDI is one of the investments that have helped set the stage for the U.S.’ ability to support Ukraine from Poland and Hungary... (Information) Technology plays a major role in DOD capabilities under this program."

References

Russo-Ukrainian War
Politics of NATO
United States foreign policy
Presidency of Barack Obama
Russia–United States relations
United States Department of Defense
Ukraine–United States relations